Adenosine deaminase deficiency (ADA deficiency)  is a  metabolic disorder that causes immunodeficiency. It is caused by  mutations in the ADA gene. It accounts for about 10–15% of all cases of autosomal recessive forms of severe combined immunodeficiency (SCID) among non-inbred populations.

ADA deficiency can present in infancy, childhood, adolescence, or adulthood. Age of onset and severity is related to some 29 known genotypes associated with the disorder. It occurs in fewer than one in 100,000 live births worldwide.

Signs and symptoms
The main symptoms of ADA deficiency are pneumonia, chronic diarrhea, and widespread skin rashes. Affected children also grow much more slowly than healthy children and some have developmental delay. Most individuals with ADA deficiency are diagnosed with SCID in the first 6 months of life.

An association with polyarteritis nodosa has been reported.

Genetics

The enzyme adenosine deaminase is encoded by the ADA gene on chromosome 20. ADA deficiency is inherited in an autosomal recessive manner. This means the defective gene responsible for the disorder is located on an autosome (chromosome 20 is an autosome), and two copies of the defective gene (one inherited from each parent) are required in order to be born with the disorder. The parents of an individual with an autosomal recessive disorder both carry one copy of the defective gene, but usually do not experience any signs or symptoms of the disorder.

Age of onset and severity is related to some 29 known genotypes associated with the disorder.

Pathophysiology
ADA deficiency is due to a lack of the enzyme adenosine deaminase. This deficiency results in an accumulation of deoxyadenosine, which, in turn, leads to:
 a buildup of dATP in all cells, which inhibits ribonucleotide reductase and prevents DNA synthesis, so cells are unable to divide. Since developing T cells and B cells are some of the most mitotically active cells, they are highly susceptible to this condition.
 an increase in S-adenosylhomocysteine since the enzyme adenosine deaminase is important in the purine salvage pathway; both substances are toxic to immature lymphocytes, which thus fail to mature.
Because T cells undergo proliferation and development in the thymus, affected individuals typically have a small, underdeveloped thymus.  As a result, the immune system is severely compromised or completely lacking.

Diagnosis                 
The diagnosis is based on clinical features, with a concomitant decreased blood adenosine deaminase level supporting the diagnosis.

Treatment
Treatments include:
 bone marrow transplant
 ADA enzyme in PEG vehicle

Gene therapy 

In September 1990, the first gene therapy to combat this disease was performed by Dr. William French Anderson on a four-year-old girl, Ashanti DeSilva, at the National Institutes of Health, Bethesda, Maryland, U.S.A.
In April 2016 the Committee for Medicinal Products for Human Use of the European Medicines Agency endorsed and recommended for approval a stem cell gene therapy called Strimvelis, for children with ADA-SCID for whom no matching bone marrow donor is available.

History
ADA deficiency was discovered in 1972 by Eloise Giblett, a professor at the University of Washington. The ADA gene was used as a marker for bone marrow transplants. A lack of ADA activity was discovered by Giblett in an immunocompromised transplant candidate. After discovering a second case of ADA deficiency in an immunocompromised patient, ADA deficiency was recognized as the first immunodeficiency disorder.

References

Further reading
 Adenosine deaminase deficiency - Genetics Home Reference

External links 

Autosomal recessive disorders
Rare diseases
Inborn errors of purine-pyrimidine metabolism
Combined T and B–cell immunodeficiencies